Adinda Nugraheni  (born 9 April 2002) is an Indonesian para badminton player. She won gold medal at the 2021 Asian Youth Para Games with Hikmat Ramdani in mixed doubles.

Achievements

Asian Youth Para Games 
Girls' singles

Mixed doubles

References

Notes

External links
 Adinda Nugraheni at BWFpara.tournamentsoftware.com

Living people
Indonesian female badminton players
Indonesian para-badminton players
2002 births
21st-century Indonesian women